Ospino is a town in the Venezuelan state of Portuguesa.  This town is the shire town of the Ospino Municipality and, according to the 2001 Venezuelan census, the municipality has a population of 39,215.

References

External links
ospino-portuguesa.gob.ve 
Information on the Ospino Municipality 

Populated places in Portuguesa (state)